Tomáš Marek (born 20 April 1981) is a Czech former football player.

In the 2006–07 Gambrinus liga, Marek was one of four players in the league to play every minute of every match.

His only Czech Republic appearance came in a friendly match against Morocco on 11 February 2009.

References

External links
 
 
 
 

1981 births
Living people
Czech footballers
Czech Republic international footballers
Czech First League players
SK Kladno players
FC Viktoria Plzeň players
FC Baník Ostrava players
FC Vysočina Jihlava players
Sportspeople from Kladno
Association football midfielders